Patterdale is a small village in English Lake District in the Eden District of Cumbria.

Patterdale may also refer to:
 Patterdale Terrier, a breed of dog
Patterdale Hall, a building of the Bolton School

See also